We take the functional theoretic algebra C[0, 1] of curves. For each loop γ at 1, and each positive integer n, we define a curve  called n-curve. The n-curves are interesting in two ways.
Their f-products, sums and differences give rise to many beautiful curves.
Using the n-curves, we can define a transformation of curves, called n-curving.

Multiplicative inverse of a curve 
A curve γ in the functional theoretic algebra  C[0, 1], is invertible, i.e.

 

exists if

 

If , where , then

 

The set G of invertible curves is a non-commutative group under multiplication. Also the set H of loops at 1 is an Abelian subgroup of G. If , then the mapping  is an inner automorphism of the group G.

We use these concepts to define n-curves and n-curving.

n-curves and their products 
If x is a real number and [x] denotes the greatest integer not greater than x, then 

If  and n is a positive integer, then define a curve  by

 

 is also a loop at 1 and we call it an n-curve.
Note that every curve in H is a 1-curve.

Suppose 
Then, since .

Example  1: Product of the astroid with the n-curve of the unit circle 
Let us take u, the unit circle centered at the origin and  α, the astroid.
The n-curve of u is given by,

 

and the astroid is

 

The parametric equations of their product  are

See the figure.

Since both  are loops at 1, so is the product.

Example  2:  Product of  the unit circle and its n-curve 
The unit circle is
 

and its n-curve is
 

The parametric equations of their product

are

See the figure.

Example 3: n-Curve of the Rhodonea minus the Rhodonea curve 
Let us take the Rhodonea Curve

 

If  denotes the curve,

 

n-Curving 
If , then, as mentioned above, the n-curve .
It can be verified that

 

This new curve has the same initial and end points as α.

Example 1 of n-curving 

Let ρ denote the Rhodonea curve , which is a loop at 1. Its parametric equations are

 

With the loop ρ we shall n-curve the cosine curve

 

The curve  has the parametric equations

 

See the figure.

It is a curve that starts at the point (0, 1) and ends at (2π, 1).

Example 2 of n-curving 

Let χ denote the Cosine Curve

 

With another Rhodonea Curve

we shall n-curve the cosine curve.

The rhodonea curve can also be given as

 

The curve  has the parametric equations

 

Generalized n-curving 
In the FTA C[0, 1] of curves, instead of e we shall take an arbitrary curve , a loop at 1.
This is justified since

Then, for a curve γ in  C[0, 1],

and
 

If , the mapping

given by

is the n-curving. We get the formula

 

 given by  the above formula.

This we shall call generalized n-curving.

Example 1 

Note that 

The transformed curve  has the parametric equations

Example 2 
Denote the curve called Crooked Egg by  whose polar equation is

 

Its parametric equations are

 
 

Let us take  and 

where  is the unit circle.

The n-curved Archimedean spiral has the parametric equations

 

References 
 Sebastian Vattamattam, "Transforming Curves by n-Curving", in Bulletin of Kerala Mathematics Association, Vol. 5, No. 1, December 2008
 Sebastian Vattamattam, Book of Beautiful Curves, Expressions, Kottayam, January 2015 Book of Beautiful Curves

External links 
 The Siluroid Curve

Curves